Jošavica is a village in central Croatia, in the Town of Petrinja, Sisak-Moslavina County. It is connected by the D30 highway.

Demographics
According to the 2011 census, the village of Jošavica has 84 inhabitants. This represents 19.44% of its pre-war population according to the 1991 census.

According to the 1991 census,  98.38% of the village population were ethnic Serbs (425/432),  0.23% were ethnic Croats (1/432), while 1.39% were of other ethnic origin (6/432).

Religion
Serbian Orthodox Church of Saint George was built in the village in the mid 19th century. Most probably it was constructed on the site of earlier wooden church. The building was damaged during the World War II and its reconstruction was completed in 1968. As of 2008 a new reconstruction of deteriorated building, funded by the Ministry of Culture, was not completed.

Notable natives and residents
Živko Juzbašić (1924–2015) - antifascist and partisan fighter, politician

References

Populated places in Sisak-Moslavina County
Serb communities in Croatia